Filip Kmiciński (21 October 1895 – 6 January 1976) was a Polish footballer. He played in one match for the Poland national football team in 1925.

References

External links
 

1895 births
1976 deaths
Polish footballers
Poland international footballers
Place of birth missing
Association footballers not categorized by position